Stolen Identity is a 1953 Austrian film directed by Gunther von Fritsch and starring Donald Buka, Joan Camden and Francis Lederer.

The film is the English-language version of the film Adventure in Vienna (1952), directed by Emil-Edwin Reinert, starring Gustav Fröhlich and Cornell Borchers. Besides the two leading roles the cast of both films is essentially the same.

Plot
Vienna taxi driver Toni Sponer dreams of going to the US. One day, an American businessman is waiting for his cab, when jealous concert pianist Claude Manelli (Lederer) shoots him dead because he suspected him of having an affair with his American wife Karen (Camden). Toni grabs the dead man's papers and takes over his identity. Later he falls in love with Karen who initially thinks that Toni is the killer but he is able to convince her that he is innocent. Together they try to flee to America with Karen's husband in hot pursuit. Both men are finally captured by the police but Toni receives only a small sentence of a few months in prison. Karen decides to wait for him.

Cast
 Donald Buka as Toni Sponer 
 Joan Camden as Karen Manelli 
 Francis Lederer as Claude Manelli 
 Adrienne Gessner as Mrs. Fraser 
 Inge Konradi as Marie 
 Hermann Erhardt as Inspector 
 Egon von Jordan as Kruger

Production
The film was known as I Was Jack Mortimer.

Reception
The film reportedly paid for itself in Germany.

See also
I Was Jack Mortimer (1935)

References

External links
 
 
 

1953 films
1950s thriller films
Austrian thriller films
English-language Austrian films
Austrian black-and-white films
Film noir
Films set in Austria
Films set in Vienna
Films shot in Vienna
Films about identity theft
Austrian multilingual films
Remakes of German films
Films based on Austrian novels
1950s multilingual films
Films about taxis
Films directed by Gunther von Fritsch
1950s English-language films